Yidiny, Yidin, Yidinj, or Yidiñ,  may refer to:
 Yidiny people, an Australian ethnic group
 Yidiny language, an Australian language

Language and nationality disambiguation pages